In mathematics, the Dwork unit root zeta function, named after Bernard Dwork, is the L-function attached to the p-adic Galois representation arising from the p-adic etale cohomology of an algebraic variety defined over a global function field of characteristic p.  The Dwork conjecture (1973) states that his unit root zeta function is p-adic meromorphic everywhere. This conjecture was proved 
by Wan (2000).

References. 

Zeta and L-functions
Conjectures that have been proved